Nikita Vladimirovich Chagrov (born 24 April 1995) is a Russian football player who plays for Kazakh club FC Okzhetpes.

Club career
He made his debut in the Russian Professional Football League for FC Chayka Peschanokopskoye on 26 August 2016 in a game against FC Armavir.

He made his Russian Football National League debut for FC Avangard Kursk on 4 March 2018 in a game against FC Yenisey Krasnoyarsk.

On 17 January 2020, he signed a 2.5-year contract with Russian Premier League club FC Tambov. He made his Russian Premier League debut for Tambov on 26 September 2020 in a game against FC Spartak Moscow.

References

External links
 
 
 

1995 births
Living people
Footballers from Moscow
Association football goalkeepers
Russian footballers
FC Torpedo Moscow players
FC Rostov players
FC Chayka Peschanokopskoye players
FC Avangard Kursk players
FC Tambov players
Kórdrengir players
FC Okzhetpes players
Russian Premier League players
1. deild karla players
Russian expatriate footballers
Expatriate footballers in Iceland
Expatriate footballers in Kazakhstan
Russian expatriate sportspeople in Iceland
Russian expatriate sportspeople in Kazakhstan